Adelchi Virgili (born 10 March 1990) is an Italian tennis player.

Virgili has a career high ATP singles ranking of 394 achieved on 16 October 2017. He also has a career high ATP doubles ranking of 378 achieved on 9 September 2013.

Virgili made his ATP main draw debut at the 2016 Delray Beach International Tennis Championships in the doubles draw partnering Sander Groen.

References

External links

1990 births
Living people
Italian male tennis players
21st-century Italian people